River Grove is a village in Cook County, Illinois, United States. The population was 10,612 at the 2020 census.

Geography
River Grove is located at  (41.925830, -87.840135).

History
Just as nearby Elmwood Park and Oak Park are named after their historic elm and oak trees, River Grove gets its two-part name first from the community's shallow, muddy Des Plaines River, and second from the majestic groves of American ash trees lining shore of the river's "bottomland." Credit goes to the village's early German and Nordic settlers who, already holding a great reverence for the "mystic ash" through old world traditions, felt that they were home again among the familiar groves of ash trees, "just like the ones they left behind."  Up until the modern day extinction event of the American ash tree species 2006–2018, River Grove was the home to Cook County's second-oldest green ash with an estimated age of 240 in the "old growth" Lafrombose Woods, along with several other living examples of locally evolved white, green, black and blue ash types 110–160 years of age scattered around the village. Because the invasive Asian emerald ash borer kills off young trees long before they reach seeding age of 10, scientists theorize that the "Fraxinus/ash" species will no longer be able to germinate continued generations by 2018 within the local woods, or only 12 years after EAB was first discovered in River Grove.

James Kirie (1911-2000), businessman and Illinois state representative, was born in River Grove.

Demographics
As of the 2020 census there were 10,612 people, 3,642 households, and 2,467 families residing in the village. The racial makeup of the village was 68.33% White, 2.21% African American, 1.04% Native American, 2.25% Asian, 0.01% Pacific Islander, 14.64% from other races, and 11.52% from two or more races. Hispanic or Latino of any race were 31.54% of the population.

There were 3,642 households, out of which 57.39% had children under the age of 18 living with them, 50.11% were married couples living together, 14.11% had a female householder with no husband present, and 32.26% were non-families. 30.53% of all households were made up of individuals, and 13.51% had someone living alone who was 65 years of age or older. The average household size was 3.40 and the average family size was 2.73.

The village's age distribution consisted of 23.0% under the age of 18, 7.1% from 18 to 24, 29.1% from 25 to 44, 27% from 45 to 64, and 13.7% who were 65 years of age or older. The median age was 36.2 years. For every 100 females, there were 89.7 males. For every 100 females age 18 and over, there were 85.4 males.

The median income for a household in the village was $63,193, and the median income for a family was $74,795. Males had a median income of $47,095 versus $31,187 for females. The per capita income for the village was $27,547. About 9.0% of families and 10.0% of the population were below the poverty line, including 15.2% of those under age 18 and 7.0% of those age 65 or over.

Businesses
The hot dog stand Gene's & Jude's is located on Grand Avenue and Des Plaines River Road, specializing in a variation of Chicago-style hot dogs. In 2011, in a competition of 64 stands across the country, it was chosen by the magazine Every Day with Rachael Ray and the food blog Serious Eats as the best hot dog in America.

Follett, a multi-national book services company, was based in River Grove until 2014, when the company relocated to Westchester, IL.

Rich’s Fresh Market is an international supermarket located in the Thatcher Woods Center on Thatcher Avenue and Belmont Avenue. The supermarket opened in 2015; the space formerly belonged to now defunct Dominick’s.

Other River Grove businesses: https://www.rivergroveil.gov/BusinessDirectoryii.aspx?ysnShowAll=1&lngNewPage=0&txtLetter=&txtZipCode=&txtCity=&txtState=&txtBusinessName=&lngBusinessCategoryID=&txtCustomField1=&txtCustomField2=&txtCustomField3=&txtCustomField4=&txtAreaCode=

Transportation
River Grove has a station on Metra's North Central Service and Milwaukee District/West Line, which provide daily rail service from Chicago Union Station to Antioch and Elgin, respectively.

Education
 Tertiary
Triton College, site of the Cernan Earth and Space Center planetarium
 Public K-12
River Grove School District 85.5 (operating River Grove Elementary School)
Elmwood Park High School 
Rhodes School District 84.5 (operating Rhodes Elementary School)
 Private K-12
Saint Cyprian Elementary School of the Roman Catholic Archdiocese of Chicago (Closed in 2018)
Bethlehem Lutheran Elementary School (Closed in 2010)
Guerin College Preparatory High School - Guerin will close permanently after Spring 2020.

References

External links

www.rivergroveil.gov Village of River Grove official website

Chicago metropolitan area
Villages in Cook County, Illinois
Villages in Illinois